Petrus Reininus Johannes "Peter" van Niekerk (born 30 November 1971 in Hazerswoude) is a sailor from the Netherlands, who represented his country for the first time at the 2000 Summer Olympics in Sydney. With Roy Heiner as helmsman and Dirk de Ridder as fellow crew member, Van Niekerk took the 4th place in the Soling. In the 2004 Olympics in Athena Van Niekerk made his second Olympic appearance. This time in the Star with Mark Neeleman as helmsman. They took 14th place.

In 1997–98, he was a crewmember on Volvo 60 yacht Brunel Sunergy in the Whitbread Round the World Race and in 2008–09 on yacht Delta Lloyd in the Volvo Ocean Race.

He sailed for ALL4ONE Challenge in the 2010 Louis Vuitton Trophy Dubai.

References

External links
 
 
 

1971 births
Living people
People from Hazerswoude
Dutch male sailors (sport)
Olympic sailors of the Netherlands
Sailors at the 2000 Summer Olympics – Soling
Sailors at the 2004 Summer Olympics – Star
Volvo Ocean Race sailors
5.5 Metre class sailors
World Champions in 5.5 Metre
World champions in sailing for the Netherlands
European Champions Soling
Sportspeople from South Holland